My New Obsession is the second full-length release by I Voted for Kodos. Unlike the previous album, My New Obsession focused less on ska, and branched to other genres such as pop punk and rock. This effectively alienated them from their entire fanbase, quickly leading to the band's demise.

Track listing
 "Turn The Radio On "
 "Never Go Home"
 "Friday Night Lights Out"
 "These Scars Won't Heal Themselves"
 "Radio Love Song"
 "Please Die In A Fire"
 "You're My Favorite "
 "Wishful Thinking In Fourth Period"
 "Sherrie's Song"
 "Three Day's 'til Rome"
 "Perfecting The Art Of Persuasion"

The band also released a Japanese version of the album with three additional songs:

 "Turn It Up"
 "Good Riddance"
 "I Won’t Be Home For Christmas"

Credits
Rick Bisenius - lead vocals, moog, piano, trombone, alto sax
Lee Gordon – guitar, mellophone, backing vocals
Tyler Christensen – guitar, backing vocals
Ross Gilliland - bass
Troy Riechenberger – drums

2006 albums
I Voted for Kodos albums